December (Hangul: 디셈버) is a South Korean duo formed by CS Happy Entertainment in 2009. They debuted on October 27, 2009 with Dear My Lover.

Discography

Studio albums

Extended plays

Singles

Collaborations

Soundtrack appearances

Awards and nominations

References

South Korean musical duos
Musical groups from Seoul
Musical groups established in 2009
2009 establishments in South Korea
Pop music duos
Contemporary R&B duos